Shanghai Lily may refer to:

A main character in Shanghai Express (film)
A brand of cervical cap available in China